In mathematics, subshifts of finite type are used to model dynamical systems, and in particular are the objects of study in symbolic dynamics and ergodic theory. They also describe the set of all possible sequences executed by a finite state machine. The most widely studied shift spaces are the subshifts of finite type.

Definition
Let  be a finite set of  symbols (alphabet).  Let X denote the set  of all bi-infinite sequences of elements of V together with the shift operator T.  We endow V with the discrete topology and X with the product topology.  A symbolic flow or subshift is a closed T-invariant subset Y of X  and the associated language LY is the set of finite subsequences of Y.

Now let  be an  adjacency matrix with entries in {0,1}. Using these elements we construct a directed graph G=(V,E) with V the set of vertices and E the set of edges  containing the directed edge  in E if and only if .  Let Y be the set of all infinite admissible sequences of edges, where by admissible it is meant that the sequence is a walk of the graph, and the sequence can be either one-sided or two-sided infinite.  Let T be the left shift operator on such sequences; it plays the role of the time-evolution operator of the dynamical system.  A subshift of finite type is then defined as a pair (Y, T) obtained in this way.  If the sequence extends to infinity in only one direction, it is called a one-sided subshift of finite type, and if it is bilateral, it is called a two-sided subshift of finite type.

Formally, one may define the sequences of edges as

This is the space of all sequences of symbols such that the symbol p can be followed by the symbol q only if the (p,q)th entry of the matrix A is 1. The space of all bi-infinite sequences is defined analogously:

The shift operator T maps a sequence in the one- or two-sided shift to another by shifting all symbols to the left, i.e.

Clearly this map is only invertible in the case of the two-sided shift.

A subshift of finite type is called transitive if G is strongly connected: there is a sequence of edges from any one vertex to any other vertex. It is precisely transitive subshifts of finite type which correspond to dynamical systems with orbits that are dense.

An important special case is the full n-shift: it has a graph with an edge that connects every vertex to every other vertex; that is, all of the entries of the adjacency matrix are 1.  The full n-shift corresponds to the Bernoulli scheme without the measure.

Terminology

By convention, the term shift is understood to refer to the full n-shift.  A subshift is then any subspace of the full shift that is shift-invariant (that is, a subspace that is invariant under the action of the shift operator), non-empty, and closed for the product topology defined below. Some subshifts can be characterized by a transition matrix, as above; such subshifts are then called subshifts of finite type.  Often, subshifts of finite type are called simply shifts of finite type. Subshifts of finite type are also sometimes called topological Markov shifts.

Examples
Many chaotic dynamical systems are isomorphic to subshifts of finite type; examples include systems with transverse homoclinic connections, diffeomorphisms of closed manifolds with a positive metric entropy, the Prouhet–Thue–Morse system, the Chacon system (this is the first system shown to be weakly mixing but not strongly mixing), Sturmian systems and Toeplitz systems.

Generalizations
A sofic system is an image of a subshift of finite type where different edges of the transition graph may be mapped to the same symbol.  It may be regarded as the set of labellings of paths through an automaton: a subshift of finite type then corresponds to an automaton which is deterministic. Such systems correspond to regular languages.

Context-free systems are defined analogously, and are generated by phrase structure grammars.

A renewal system is defined to be the set of all infinite concatenations of some fixed finite collection of finite words.

Subshifts of finite type are identical to free (non-interacting) one-dimensional Potts models (n-letter generalizations of Ising models),  with certain nearest-neighbor configurations excluded. Interacting Ising models are defined as subshifts together with a continuous function of the configuration space (continuous with respect to the product topology, defined below); the partition function and Hamiltonian are explicitly expressible in terms of this function.

Subshifts may be quantized in a certain way, leading to the idea of the quantum finite automata.

Topology

and V is given the discrete topology. 

With respect to this topology, the shift T is a homeomorphism; that is,  with respect to this topology, it is continuous with continuous inverse.

The space  is homeomorphic to a Cantor set.

Metric
A variety of different metrics can be defined on a shift space. One can define a metric on a shift space by considering two points to be "close" if they have many initial symbols in common; this is the p-adic metric. In fact, both the one- and two-sided shift spaces are compact metric spaces.

Measure
A subshift of finite type may be endowed with any one of several different measures, thus leading to a measure-preserving dynamical system. A common object of study is the Markov measure, which is an extension of a Markov chain to the topology of the shift.

A Markov chain is a pair (P,π) consisting of the transition matrix, an  matrix  for which all  and

for all i. The stationary probability vector  has all  and has

.

A Markov chain, as defined above, is said to be compatible with the shift of finite type if  whenever .  The Markov measure of a cylinder set may then be defined by

The Kolmogorov–Sinai entropy with relation to the Markov measure is

Zeta function
The Artin–Mazur zeta function is defined as the formal power series

where Fix(Tn) is the set of fixed points of the n-fold shift.   It has a product formula

where γ runs over the closed orbits.  For subshifts of finite type, the zeta function is a rational function of z:

See also
 Transfer operator
 De Bruijn graph
 Quantum finite automata
 Axiom A

Notes

References
 
 David Damanik, Strictly Ergodic Subshifts and Associated Operators, (2005)
 
 Natasha Jonoska, Subshifts of Finite Type, Sofic Systems and Graphs, (2000).
 Michael S. Keane, Ergodic theory and subshifts of finite type, (1991), appearing as Chapter 2 in Ergodic Theory, Symbolic Dynamics and Hyperbolic Spaces, Tim Bedford, Michael Keane and Caroline Series, Eds. Oxford University Press, Oxford (1991).  (Provides a short expository introduction, with exercises, and extensive references.)

Further reading
 

Ergodic theory
Automata (computation)
Markov processes
Combinatorics on words
Symbolic dynamics